Conjola Park is a beach resort in the City of Shoalhaven, New South Wales, Australia. It lies on the south shore of a lagoon called Conjola Lake, just to the east of the Princes Highway on Lake Conjola Entrance Road, which connects to the resort of Lake Conjola. It lies about 15 km north of Ulladulla and 215 km south of Sydney.

It was badly affected by a bushfire on 31 December 2019, when 89 homes were lost.

References

City of Shoalhaven